Bernardus Marinus "Ben" Pon (9 December 1936 – 30 September 2019) was a Dutch vintner and Olympian and motor racing driver. He competed in one Formula One race, the 1962 Dutch Grand Prix, but had a far longer career in sports car racing, before turning his back on the track to concentrate on the wine trade. He also represented the Netherlands in clay pigeon shooting at the 1972 Summer Olympics, finishing 31st in the skeet event.

Life
His father, Ben Pon, Sr.,  was an importer of Volkswagen Beetles into the United States, and is considered to be the "father" of the Volkswagen Type 2 due to his initial interest and input into the project.

Ben Pon was a personal friend of Formula One driver Carel Godin de Beaufort. It was de Beaufort's own Ecurie Maarsbergen privateer team that provided a Porsche 787 for him to race at Zandvoort, in his home Grand Prix on 20 May 1962. He failed to finish the race due to an accident, which flipped his car over, throwing Pon out of the cockpit and into a shrubbery. In response, Pon vowed never again to race single-seaters, and in the years that followed he remained true to his word, while achieving many successes in sports car racing also driving a Porsche. Pon retired from professional sports car racing in 1965.

After his retirement in the sports arena, Pon turned his attention to the wine trade. He was known for his Bernardus Winery in Carmel Valley, California, and owned the oldest wine negotiating business in the Netherlands.

Racing record

Complete 24 Hours of Le Mans results

Complete Formula One World Championship results
(key)

References

External links 
 Bernadus Winery website
 Profile on F1 Rejects 
 Biography of Bernadus Pon
 Who's Who of Volkswagen

1936 births
2019 deaths
Olympic shooters of the Netherlands
Shooters at the 1972 Summer Olympics
Dutch racing drivers
Dutch Formula One drivers
Ecurie Maarsbergen Formula One drivers
Dutch male sport shooters
Wine merchants
Viticulturists
24 Hours of Le Mans drivers
World Sportscar Championship drivers
Sportspeople from Amersfoort
People from Carmel Valley Village, California
12 Hours of Reims drivers
Porsche Motorsports drivers